Kantepudi is a village in Palnadu district of the Indian state of Andhra Pradesh. It is located in Sattenapalle mandal of Guntur revenue division. The village forms a part of Andhra Pradesh Capital Region and is under the jurisdiction of APCRDA.

References 

Villages in Palnadu district